Statsborgeren (Norwegian: The Citizen) was a political magazine which was published in Oslo in the period 1831–1937. It was one of the opposition publications.

History and profile
Statsborgeren was founded by Peder Soelvold in 1831. The editor of the paper was also Peder Soelvold between 1831 and 1835. The magazine criticized the government, ruling bureaucracy and fought for the rights of farmers. Due to tensions with the government Peder Soelvold had to resign from the post, and Henrik Wergeland replaced him as the editor of Statsborgeren. Wergeland  edited the magazine until 1937 when it folded.

References

External links

1831 establishments in Norway
1837 disestablishments in Norway
Defunct magazines published in Norway
Magazines established in 1831
Magazines disestablished in 1837
Magazines published in Oslo
Norwegian-language magazines
Political magazines published in Norway